Miloš Josimov (born 27 September 1984) is a Serbian professional footballer who plays as a defender for Radnički Sremska Mitrovica.

Career
In the early stages of his career, Josimov represented numerous lower league clubs, including Beograd, Morava Ćuprija, Radnički Pirot, Železničar Beograd, and Sloven Ruma. He spent his most successful years at Donji Srem, winning promotion to the Serbian SuperLiga in 2012. Due to his performances, Josimov was named in the competition's 2012–13 Team of the Season.

In June 2013, Josimov moved abroad and signed with Slovak club Slovan Bratislava, a two-year contract with an extension option. He made his competitive debut in a 1–1 league draw at home to Dunajská Streda on 12 July. Slovan won the championship with Josimov featuring in 16 out of 33 matches. In the summer of 2014, Josimov was demoted to the reserves.

In 2017, Josimov moved to Finland and joined Ykkönen side KPV, helping them win promotion to the top flight in 2018.

Honours

Club
Donji Srem
 Serbian League Vojvodina: 2010–11
Slovan Bratislava
 Slovak Super Liga: 2013–14

Individual
 Serbian SuperLiga Team of the Season: 2012–13

References

External links
 
 
 

Association football defenders
Expatriate footballers in Finland
Expatriate footballers in Slovakia
FK Beograd players
FK Donji Srem players
FK Radnički Pirot players
FK Železničar Beograd players
Kokkolan Palloveikot players
OFK Bačka players
People from Ruma
RFK Novi Sad 1921 players
Serbia and Montenegro footballers
Serbian expatriate footballers
Serbian expatriate sportspeople in Finland
Serbian expatriate sportspeople in Slovakia
Serbian First League players
Serbian footballers
Serbian SuperLiga players
ŠK Slovan Bratislava players
Slovak Super Liga players
Veikkausliiga players
Ykkönen players
1984 births
Living people
PEPO Lappeenranta players